Nemophora staudingerella is a moth of the family Adelidae or fairy longhorn moths. It was described by Hugo Theodor Christoph in 1881. It is found in the Russian Far East and Japan.

The wingspan is 17–20 mm.

References

Adelidae
Moths described in 1881
Moths of Japan
Moths of Asia